Petal is a city in Forrest County, Mississippi, along the Leaf River. It is part of the Hattiesburg, Mississippi Metropolitan Statistical Area. The population was 10,454 in the 2010 census, increasing to 11,010 in the 2020 census.

History
The first postmaster of Petal was Irving A. Polk. The post office was established in 1903 and was named after the daughter of a first settler. It is the only city in the U.S. with this name.
Petal separated from the city of Hattiesburg on April 4, 1974. Petal was a community filled with farmers. This is slowly changing with new businesses coming into the city.

The International Checker Hall of Fame was located in Petal until September 29, 2007, when  of the  building caught fire.

Petal was extensively damaged by an EF3 tornado on January 21, 2017.

Geography
The city's area had increased by nearly 75% since 2000, following an annexation effort approved in 2002. Major sub-communities as of the annex are Macedonia, Barrontown, Sunrise, and Leeville. The Harvey community (currently downtown Petal) hosts city departments.

Demographics

2010 census
As of the census of 2010, there were 10,454 people, 3,918 households, and 2,867 families residing in the city. The population density was 619.8 people per square mile. There were 4,261 housing units at an average density of 331.7 per square mile. The racial makeup of the city was 86.1% White, 9.9% African American, 0.2% Native American, 0.7% Asian, 1.3% from other races, and 1.7% from two or more races. Hispanic or Latino of any race were 3.5% of the population.

There were 3,918 households, out of which 23.5% had own children under the age of 18 living with them, 53.1% were married couples living together, 14.6% had a female householder with no husband present, and 26.8% were non-families. 39.3% of all households were made up of individuals under 18 and 26.6% had someone living alone who was 65 years of age or older. The average household size was 2.65 and the average family size was 3.13.

The median income for a household in the city was $29,637, and the median income for a family was $35,343. Males had a median income of $27,500 versus $20,741 for females. The per capita income for the city was $13,996. About 11.9% of families and 15.0% of the population were below the poverty line, including 19.4% of those under age 18 and 13.8% of those age 65 or over.

2020 Census

As of the 2020 United States census, there were 11,010 people, 3,655 households, and 2,746 families residing in the city.

Education
The city is served by the Petal School District.

Notable people
 Larry Byrd, member of the Mississippi House of Representatives
 William Leon Clark, former Deputy Chief of Chaplains of the United States Air Force
 Percy Dale East, journalist
 Demarcus Evans, Major League Baseball pitcher
 Tom King, former member of the Mississippi State Senate
 Dan M. Lee, Justice of the Supreme Court of Mississippi from 1981 to 1998
 Kris Mangum, professional football player
 Cliff Pace, 43rd World Champion of Bass Fishing, 2013 Bassmaster Classic
 Javon Patterson, professional football player
 Ray Perkins, University of Alabama wide receiver; attended Petal High School, where he was an All-American
 Nate Rolison, former Major League Baseball first baseman
 Charles Walker, former Mississippi state checkers champion
 Tom Walters, safety for the Washington Redskins

References

External links

 City of Petal official website

Cities in Mississippi
Cities in Forrest County, Mississippi
Cities in Hattiesburg metropolitan area